New Direction – The Foundation for European Reform is a political foundation at European level, think tank and publisher affiliated with the Alliance of Conservatives and Reformists in Europe (ACRE). It was established in 2010, under the patronage of Baroness Thatcher. It is based in Brussels with satellite offices in London and Warsaw. New Direction is a free-market think tank that promotes European reform through the strengthening of accountability, transparency and democracy.

Through publications, conferences and debates, New Direction is committed to serving as a resource for parliamentarians, policy makers and the public. New Direction is also a founding international partner of CapX, a digital service which commissions and aggregates news on popular capitalism from around the world.

Executive Team

The executive board and Senior Management team is made up Members of the European Parliament and policy experts.

The President of New Direction, Tomasz Poreba MEP, is a leading figure in the Law and Justice Party in Poland and vice-chairman of its delegations of MEPs in the European Parliament.

The Secretary-General, Dr Ian Duncan MEP, was the one Conservative MEP for Scotland and a leading parliamentarian in energy, agriculture, and fisheries policy in the European Parliament.

Its three vice-presidents; Hans-Olaf Henkel MEP, former head at IBM, and former President of the Federation of German Industries (BDI) and the Leibniz Association; Professor Karol Karski MEP, former Deputy Foreign Minister of Poland; and Andrew Lewer, former leader of Derbyshire County Council and a current vice-president of the Local Government Association.

Its executive director, Naweed Khan, is a former special adviser in the UK government during the 2010–2015 administration of Prime Minister David Cameron.

The founding president of New Direction is Geoffrey Van Orden MEP, who stepped down in 2015.

History

New Direction was established in 2010 and draws its inspiration from the 2009 Prague Declaration, from which the Alliance of European Conservatives and Reformists (AECR) and the European Conservatives and Reformists group (ECR) in the European Parliament were founded. As of October 2016, the AECR is known as the Alliance of Conservatives and Reformists in Europe (ACRE).

New Direction is affiliated to the European Young Conservatives (EYC) and the International Democratic Union (IDU).

Role and Mission

 Advancing Conservatism and a Europe of nation states:

New Direction's vision for Europe is for the advancement of small government, private property, free enterprise, lower taxes, family values, individual freedom, strong defence, a Europe of sovereign states and a strong trans-Atlantic alliance.

 Leading the debate on European reform:

The mission of New Direction is to strengthen the movement for European reform, by leading the debate on both sides of the Atlantic and around the world. The think tank aims to shift the EU onto a different course – away from the current orthodoxy of 'ever closer union' and central bureaucratic governance onto a path that promotes the freedom, prosperity and security of EU nations and their citizens.

 Influencing key players:

New Direction's strategy is to promote its values and ideas by influencing key players; ministers and elected officials from across Europe and the world, government officials, public policy experts, academics, business leaders, and the media.

As part of this, New Direction works closely with those who share a commitment to its values and works around the world to promote its constituent principles and issues.

New direction regularly hosts high-profile speakers including leading politicians and policy experts for panel discussions, interviews, roundtables, seminars, conferences, and public events in Europe, America, Asia and Africa.

Research and Publications

New Direction publishes timely reports, discussion papers, policy memos, articles, opinion pieces and blogs to serve as a resource for parliamentarians, policy makers and the public.

It publishes on topics including the Eurozone, finance and the economy; energy and the environment, defence, foreign policy and security; accountability, transparency and efficiency; immigration, justice and society; and transatlantic relations.

Initiatives, Prizes and Awards

The New Direction Liberty Award was created to honour people who have rendered outstanding services to political culture, freedom and civil society. The annual jury for the award is made up of notable European politicians, academics and policy specialists.

Recipients of the award have included the former Head of British Military Intelligence in West Germany, Brigadier Geoffrey Van Orden MEP, and Professor Dr Gunnar Heinsohn.

The New Direction Academy was established to train young academics in strategic leadership, research and effective communications. It aims to inspire citizens to engage with the key issues facing Europe today.

By connecting young academics and researchers with best practices, and the strategies and tools to shape politics, New Direction is investing in Europe's next generation.

References

External links
 New Direction official website

Political and economic think tanks based in the European Union
Think tanks based in Belgium
Alliance of Conservatives and Reformists in Europe
Political foundations at European level